Jailhouse rock is a name used to describe a collection of fighting styles that were practiced or developed within black urban communities in the 1960s and 1970s.

The many different manifestations of JHR share a commonality in blending western boxing with other stylised martial arts techniques. The basic principle of these styles is constant improvisation, blocks and effectiveness in real-life situations.

52 Hand Blocks has been referenced numerous times by contemporary media including by journalist Douglas Century's Street Kingdom: Five Years Inside the Franklin Avenue Posse, as well as numerous Wu-Tang Clan songs and Ted Conover's book Newjack. Recently, celebrities including actor Larenz Tate and rapper Ludacris have taken up the fighting system for film roles and self-defense, shining a brighter light on this previously underground martial art.

Origins
The existence of this martial art was originally some what debated, but mainstream media exposure has contributed towards raising the awareness of the martial art.

According to Dennis Newsome, a well-known JHR practitioner, JHR is an indigenous African American fighting art that has its origins in the 17th and 18th centuries, when slaves were first institutionalized and needed to defend themselves. Oral tradition has the skill evolving secretly within the U.S. penal system, with regional styles reflecting the physical realities of specific institutions. This theory relates JHR to the fusion of African and European/American bare-knuckle fist-fighting styles known as "cutting", which is said to have been practiced by champions such as Tom Molineaux, and also to the little-known African-American fighting skill known as "knocking and kicking", which is said to be practiced clandestinely in parts of the Southern US and on the Sea Islands.

Alternatively but unlikely and unfounded; it may be that JHR was not a product of penal institutions, but rather an evolution of the many African martial arts or fighting games which were practiced by slaves, with different styles evolving separately in different penal institutions. According to this theory, some people believe Jailhouse Rock may be a modern American manifestation of the many African martial arts that were disseminated throughout the African diaspora, comparable to martial arts including Afro-Brazilian Capoeira, Cuban Mani and Martiniquese Ladja.

It has a mythological origin story of having originated in the US penal institutions back in the 1960s and 1970s. Some have cast doubt on this origin story, as the teaching of fighting systems by inmates is generally not allowed in jails and prisons. However, others point out that the experience of any given prisoner, as well as the enforcement of the rules, varies enormously from one institution to the next, and that a great deal of prisoner life occurs in secret and necessarily in violation of the institutional rules.

Tales of the pugilistic exploits of the infamous 1970s New York prison fighter "Mother Dear" (an alleged homosexual rapist) have also contributed to the extensive urban mythology surrounding this system.

The 52 Hand Blocks aspect of JHR was first featured in Black Belt Magazine in the 1970s it was then followed by a key reference in Douglas Century's nonfiction book Street Kingdom. This book played a key role because it introduced one of 52 Blocks most senior living practitioners; Kawaun "Big K" Adon. Kawaun would unite with Martial Arts Historian Daniel Marks and Fitness Innovator Hassan Yasin (GIANT) to form the organisation Constellation. This organisation would motivate the authorship of essays like "Freeing the Afrikan Mind: the Role of Martial Arts in Contemporary African American Cultural Nationalism" by Professor Tom Green of Texas A&M University.

This martial art style became more accessible and public at the beginning of the 21st century.

Styles
JHR is divided into various regional styles. These include:
 "52 Hand Blocks" or "52" - The origins of 52 Hand Blocks, although highly debated, does coincide with golden era of martial arts in America when Chinese cinema was booming. The name 52 Hand Blocks, although contested, is most likely derived from the reference of the fifty-two blocking techniques encompassed in the art. These techniques consist of traditional western boxing blocks, covers and parries but also include elbow strikes and blocks, knees, head butts and other martial arts techniques. The name 52 may be a reference to the playing card game of 52 Pickup and to the expression "let the cards fall where they may." There are many  theories relating to the name including a reference to a combat training system involving the use of playing cards, a theory the name simply derives from a reference to a specific cell block and even some claims bordering on the supernatural with practitioners trying to connect 52 to the Supreme Mathematics of the Nation of Gods and Earths. However, the most likely and accepted explanation is that it simply refers to the fifty-two blocking techniques encompassed in the art.
 Gorilla 
 Stato 
 Coxsacki Style
 Woodbourne Style
 Comstock Style
 San Quentin Style
 Bum Rush
 Mount Meg
 42nd
 Closing Gates

Jailhouse rock in the media
 According to researcher Douglas Century, professional boxers, including Zab Judah and Mike Tyson, have testified to possessing knowledge of the style. The 1974 Black Belt Magazine article claims that both Kid Gavilan and Floyd Patterson were trained in the Coxsacki-style of JHR.
 The style is also referred to in many rap songs by artists such as the Wu-Tang Clan.
 Larenz Tate underwent extensive training in the 52 Blocks variant of Jailhouse rock for his 2011 film Gun Hill.
 Mel Gibson was trained in Jailhouse Rock by Dennis Newsome, for his part in the first Lethal Weapon film.
 Def Jam: Fight for NY uses this for the street fighting style in game.

See also
 Gouging (fighting style)
 Bare-knuckle boxing
 Street fighting

Bibliography

References

Sources

 52 Blocks Constellation Inc, Changing of the Guard: The History of 52 Blocks an American Martial Art (2009), documentary
Douglas Century, Street Kingdom: Five Years Inside the Franklin Avenue Posse, Warner Books, 2000, 
Douglas Century, "Ghetto Blasters: Born in prison, raised in the 'hood, the deadly art of 52 Blocks is Brooklyn's baddest secret", Details magazine 19:9, pp 77–79, August 2001.
  Dennis Newsome, Jailhouse Rock (A.k.a.) 52 blocks system.

Green, Thomas "Freeing the Afrikan Mind: the Role of Martial Arts in Contemporary African American Cultural Nationalism", essay featured in "Martial Arts in the Modern World", Praeger Publishers, 2003, 

J.S. Soet, 'Martial Arts Around the World, Unique Publications, 1991
J.S. Soet, 'Martial Arts Around the World II, Unique Publications, 2001
 "Fighting Arts International", Vol. 8, No. 2, 1987

North American martial arts
Martial arts in the United States
Hybrid martial arts